Wheelchair tennis at the 2019 Parapan American Games took place from 24 to 30 August at the Club Lawn Tennis de La Exposcicion in Lima. The men's and women's singles champions qualified directly for the 2020 Summer Paralympics.

Participating nations
There were 44 tennis players from 14 countries scheduled to compete. They were ranked according to singles' rankings as of 8 July 2019. Argentina's Gustavo Fernandez was the reigning men's singles champion while Natalia Mayara from Brazil hoped to win the gold medal in the women's singles.

 (Host country)

Medalists

See also
Tennis at the 2019 Pan American Games
Wheelchair tennis at the 2020 Summer Paralympics

References

2019 Parapan American Games
2019 in tennis